José Saturnino Cardozo Otazú (born 19 March 1971) is a Paraguayan football manager and former professional footballer. He played as a striker and spent 10 years of his career playing for Toluca and is the club's all-time top goalscorer. He also managed Toluca in 2013 up to 2016. He is currently manager for Liga Nacional club Municipal.

Cardozo earned 82 caps for Paraguay between 1991 and 2006, putting him ninth in their most-capped players of all time, with his haul of 25 international goals the second most for the nation. He represented them at three Copa América tournaments, two FIFA World Cups, and the 2004 Olympic tournament, winning silver in the latter.

Club career
Born in Nueva Italia in the Central Department, Cardozo began his professional career in 1988, making his debut for River Plate of Paraguay.  After four years in River, he moved to Swiss club FC St. Gallen, where he played from 1990 to 1992.  He returned to South America in 1993, joining Universidad Católica de Chile helping the team reach the 1993 Copa Libertadores de América final. The following year he played for Club Olimpia of Paraguay, from which he moved to Club Toluca of Mexico.

Cardozo made his debut for Toluca in the 1995 season, but only appeared in three games, scoring no goals.  However, in the subsequent winter season, he scored 7 goals in 13 games. In his ten years with the team, he has scored a record 249 goals for the club, including 36 goals in 25 matches in the 2002 Apertura. Cardozo was top scorer of the league four times (Verano 1998, Verano 1999, Apertura 2002, and Clausura 2003). He moved to the 4th spot in the list of all-time top scorers in the Mexico Primera Division after Jared Borgetti scored his 250th goal with Monarcas Morelia.

Due to his work at Toluca, Cardozo was elected as the Paraguayan Footballer of the Year in the years 2000, 2002 and 2003; and the South American Footballer of the Year in 2002. Despite the fact that he was fiercely opposed to the move, Cardozo was transferred to Argentine team San Lorenzo de Almagro in June 2005, and finished the season with only 4 goals due to injuries that kept him away from playing several games. However, many critics lambasted Cardozo for refusing to play through the pain. While playing for Toluca, Cardozo struggled through the 1997 campaign with hamstring problems and then played through much of the 2001 season despite suffering a broken wrist in the season opener. Cardozo is the all-time leading scorer for Toluca, with 249 goals in 332 appearances.

In July 2006, Cardozo attempted to return to Club Olimpia to finish his career. He was unable to re-sign for the club because the Paraguayan league's transfer deadline had already passed. As a result of his inability to sign for Olimpia, he decided to retire from football. He scored 342 goals total in his career. In June 2008 a farewell match was organized in the city of Toluca to honor his career and contributions to football. Cardozo scored two goals in the match which had a sellout crowd.

Paraguay national team
Cardozo was the all-time leading scorer for the Paraguay national team, with 25 goals, until 2013, with the record being broken by Roque Santa Cruz. He played for his country at the 1998 and 2002 World Cups and was named in the original 2006 World Cup squad but he was injured during training sessions and replaced by Dante López. Cardozo was also an over-age player at the 2004 Summer Olympics, when Paraguay finished second. On 4 August, before the Summer Olympics began, he played in a preparation game against the Portugal of Cristiano Ronaldo in the city of Algarve, resulting in a 5–0 defeat. He scored a hat-trick against Uruguay in the 2006 FIFA World Cup qualification, with the final result being 4–1.

International goals

Paraguay U23
Score and Result list Paraguay's goal tally first.

Paraguay

Coaching career

Club Olimpia
In November 2006, Club Olimpia's coach Oscar Paulin was fired due to poor performances by the team and Cardozo was named as the interim coach of the Paraguayan club, this being his first experience as a coach. He coached for the remainder of the year and for the 2007 Apertura tournament.true

Indios
In October 2009 he was hired to be an assistant coach for the team of Indios de Juarez for the Apertura 2009.

Club Olimpia (Return)
Cardozo returned to Olimpia Asunción in November 2009 following coach Carlos Kiese's resignation.

Querétaro FC
In 2011, he was hired as coach Querétaro FC where he led the team into their first liguilla and the team's all team highest place (8th) and points (26) in Primera División regular season. He managed to eliminate Guadalajara in the Quarter Finals and advance to a surprising semi-final where they lost to champions Tigres UANL 1–0. The following season however, Querétaro began the season with poor results, which once again emerged relegation problems against rivals Atlas and Estudiantes Tecos (relegated) which led to Cardozo's resignation.

Club Olimpia (Return)
After spending the 2011 and 2012 seasons at Querétaro, he was appointed to manage Olimpia once again on 25 September 2012 after the departure of Gregorio Perez.

Toluca
On 7 May 2013, Cardozo was announced as the new manager for Club Deportivo Toluca of Mexico where he played for 10 years (1995-2005). On 1 May 2016, during the 2016 Clausura, Cardozo confirmed that he would no longer coach Toluca beyond the end of the season despite still having a year left on his contract. He stated that since he did not meet his objective of reaching the Liga MX playoffs with the club, he had nothing more to do with the club, citing that Toluca was a big club with directors and fans that expected a lot more of the team than he could continue to offer. He stated that when a team can no longer accomplish what is asked of it, that the first change that must come is the manager, no questions about it.

Chiapas
Cardozo had a turbulent season at Chiapas during the Apertura 2016, being sacked in September and then brought back due to the petition of the chiapas players. He was ultimately sacked one week later after two more defeats.

Puebla
Cardozo took over Puebla FC early in the Clausura 2017 season.

Guadalajara
On 12 June 2018, Cardozo was appointed manager of Liga MX club Guadalajara.

Honours
Olimpia
Paraguayan League: 1993

Toluca
Mexican Primera División: Verano 1998, Verano 1999, Verano 2000, Apertura 2002
CONCACAF Champions' Cup: 2003

Paraguay
CONMEBOL Men Pre-Olympic Tournament: 1992
Summer Olympics silver medal: 2004

Individual
Mexican Primera División Golden Ball: Apertura 2002
Mexican Primera División Golden Boot: Verano 1998, Verano 1999, Apertura 2002, Clausura 2003
FIFA World Topscorer of the Year: 2003 (58 goals)
Paraguayan Footballer of the Year: 2000, 2002, 2003
South American Footballer of the Year: 2002
All-time scorer for Deportivo Toluca (249 goals)

See also
 Players and Records in Paraguayan Football

References

External links
 International statistics at rsssf
 
 
 Argentine Primera statistics at Fútbol XXI 

1971 births
Living people
Paraguayan footballers
Association football forwards
FC St. Gallen players
River Plate (Asunción) footballers
Club Deportivo Universidad Católica footballers
Club Olimpia footballers
Cruz Azul footballers
Deportivo Toluca F.C. players
San Lorenzo de Almagro footballers
Paraguayan Primera División players
Chilean Primera División players
Argentine Primera División players
Liga MX players
Paraguayan expatriate footballers
Expatriate footballers in Argentina
Expatriate footballers in Chile
Expatriate footballers in Mexico
Expatriate footballers in Switzerland
Paraguayan expatriate sportspeople in Argentina
Paraguayan expatriate sportspeople in Chile
Paraguayan expatriate sportspeople in Mexico
Expatriate football managers in Mexico
Paraguay international footballers
Olympic footballers of Paraguay
Olympic silver medalists for Paraguay
Footballers at the 2004 Summer Olympics
1998 FIFA World Cup players
2002 FIFA World Cup players
Club Olimpia managers
Querétaro F.C. managers
Deportivo Toluca F.C. managers
Chiapas F.C. managers
C.D. Guadalajara managers
1991 Copa América players
1995 Copa América players
1997 Copa América players
South American Footballer of the Year winners
Olympic medalists in football
Medalists at the 2004 Summer Olympics
Paraguayan football managers
Liga MX managers
Sportivo Luqueño managers